Vladimir Vranješ (born 14 December 1988) is a Bosnian handball player for S.L. Benfica. He was a part of the Bosnian national team for 12 years.

He previously played for Borac Banja Luka, RK Prijedor, RK Slovenj Gradec, Ademar Leon and SC Pick Szeged. Vranješ is a pivot known as a defensive specialist. He won the EHF Cup for 2013–14 season with Pick Szeged.

References

External links

1988 births
Living people
Sportspeople from Banja Luka
Bosnia and Herzegovina male handball players
Expatriate handball players
Bosnia and Herzegovina expatriate sportspeople in Hungary
Bosnia and Herzegovina expatriate sportspeople in Spain
CB Ademar León players
RK Borac Banja Luka players
SC Pick Szeged players
Mediterranean Games competitors for Bosnia and Herzegovina
Competitors at the 2009 Mediterranean Games
Serbs of Bosnia and Herzegovina